The 1924 Tennessee Volunteers football team (variously "Tennessee", "UT" or the "Vols") represented the University of Tennessee in the 1924 college football season.  Playing as a member of the Southern Conference (SoCon), the team was led by head coach M. B. Banks, in his fourth year, and played their home games at Shields–Watkins Field in Knoxville, Tennessee. The 1924 Vols won three and lost five games (3–5 overall, 0–4 in the SoCon). Tennessee was outscored by their opponents 135 to 83 and shutout twice.

Schedule

Players

References

Tennessee
Tennessee Volunteers football seasons
Tennessee Volunteers football